A special election was held in  on November 15, 1796 to fill a vacancy left in both the 4th and 5th Congresses by the resignation of Benjamin Bourne (F).

Election results

Potter took his seat December 19, 1796 but the subsequently resigned after the 1st Session of the 5th Congress, resulting in a second special election

See also
List of special elections to the United States House of Representatives

References

Rhode Island 1796 at-large
Rhode Island 1796 at-large
Rhode Island 1796 at-large
1796 at-large Special
Rhode Island at-large Special
United States House of Representatives at-large Special
United States House of Representatives 1796 at-large